Palestra Itália Futebol Clube, commonly known as Palestra Itália, were a Brazilian football team from Curitiba, Paraná state. They won the Campeonato Paranaense three times.

History
Palestra Itália Futebol Clube were founded on January 7, 1921. During World War II they changed their name to Paranaense, then Comercial and then Palmeiras. After the war, in 1945, the club was renamed again to Palestra Itália. They won the Campeonato Paranaense in 1924, 1926, and in 1932. The club fused with Britânia Sport Club and Clube Atlético Ferroviário in 1971, forming Colorado Esporte Clube.

Stadium

Palestra Itália played their home games at Estádio Tarumã. The stadium had a maximum capacity of 6,000 people.

Achievements

 Campeonato Paranaense:
 Winners (3): 1924, 1926, 1932

References

Defunct football clubs in Paraná (state)
Association football clubs established in 1921
Association football clubs disestablished in 1971
Paraná Clube
Sport in Curitiba
1921 establishments in Brazil
1971 disestablishments in Brazil